Gliese 581b or Gl 581b is an extrasolar planet orbiting within the Gliese 581 system. It is the first planet discovered of three confirmed in the system so far, and the second in order from the star.

Discovery 
The planet was discovered by a team of French and Swiss astronomers, who announced their findings on November 30, 2005, as a discovery of one of the smallest extrasolar planets ever found, with one conclusion being that planets may be more common around the smallest stars. It was the fifth planet found around a red dwarf star (after Gliese 876's planets and Gliese 436 b).

The planet was discovered using the HARPS instrument, with which they found the host star to have a wobble that implied the existence of the planet.

The astronomers published their results in Astronomy and Astrophysics Letters.

Orbit and mass 
Gliese 581b is at a minimum, approximately 15.8 times the Earth's mass, similar to Neptune's mass. It does not transit its star, implying that its inclination is less than 88.1 degrees. It is rather close to Gliese 581 and completes a full orbit in only 5.4 days at a mean distance of about 6 million kilometers (0.041 AU).  By comparison, Mercury is at a distance of 58 million kilometers (0.387 AU) and completes an orbit in 88 days.

Characteristics 
Gliese 581b is about 0.04 AU from its sun. It is likely close to Gliese 436 b in mass, temperature, and (with Gliese 876 d) susceptibility to solar effects such as coronal mass ejection. Gliese 581b does not transit. At the least, given that Gliese 581b orbits alongside two other planets (Gliese 581c and e) and that Gliese 436 b (thus far) stands alone, their formation must have differed.

See also 
Habitability of red dwarf systems

References

External links 

 ESO: The Dwarf that Carries a World
 SolStation: Gliese 581 / HO Librae

Exoplanets in the Gliese Catalog
Gliese 581
Exoplanets discovered in 2005
Hot Neptunes
Libra (constellation)